Sangeet Natak Akademi Award (IPA: Saṅgīta Nāṭaka Akādamī Puraskāra), also known as the Akademi Puraskar, is an award given by the Sangeet Natak Akademi, India's National Academy of Music, Dance & Drama. It is the highest Indian recognition given to people in the field of performing arts. In 2003, the award consisted of Rs. 50,000, a citation, an angavastram (a shawl), and a tamrapatra (a brass plaque). Since 2009, the cash prize has been increased to ₹1,000,000. The awards are given in the categories of music, dance, theatre, other traditional arts and puppetry, and for contribution/scholarship in performing arts.

Award recipients 
The recipients of the Sangeet Natak Akademi award in various categories of performing arts have been listed below:

Music

Hindustani music

Vocal 

1952 – Mushtaq Hussain Khan
1953 – Kesarbai Kerkar
1954 – Rajab Ali Khan
1955 – Anant Manohar Joshi
1956 – Rajabhaiyya Poonchhwale
1957 – Rasoolan Bai
1958 – Ganesh Ramachandra Behere
1959 – Krishnarao Shankar Pandit
1960 – Altaf Hussain Khan
1961 – Y. S. Mirashi Buwa
1962 – Bade Ghulam Ali Khan
1963 – Omkarnath Thakur
1964 – Rahimuddin Khan Dagar
1965 – Hirabai Barodekar
1966 – Siddheswari Devi
1967 – Amir Khan
1968 – Mogubai Kurdikar
1969 – Ramchatur Mallick
1970 – Nisar Hussain Khan
1971 – Mallikarjun Mansur
1972 – Begum Akhtar
1973 – Gangubai Hangal
1974 – Kumar Gandharva
1975 – Bhimsen Joshi
1975-76 Gavri Devi (Vocal) (Jodhpur, Rajasthan)
1976 – Narayanrao Vyas
1977 – Girija Devi
1978 – Khadim Hussain Khan
1979 – Sarachchandra Arolkar
1980 – Nivruttibua Sarnaik
1981 – Basavaraj Rajguru
1982 – Vasantrao Deshpande
1983 – Mahadev Prasad Mishra
1984 – Sharafat Hussain Khan
1985 – Kishori Amonkar, Aminuddin Dagar
1986 – Gavri Devi  (Vocal) (Jodhpur, Rajasthan)
1986 – Asgari Bai, Firoz Dastur, Manik Varma
1987 – C. R. Vyas, Shobha Gurtu, Pandit Jasraj
1988 – Padmavati Gokhale Shaligram
1989 – Jitendra Abhisheki
1990 – K. G. Ginde, Dhondutai Kulkarni
1991 – N. Zahiruddin Dagar, Prabha Atre
1992 – Ramarao V. Naik, Shiv Kumar Shukla
1993 – Bala Saheb Poochwale, Rahim Fahimuddin Dagar
1994 – Sulochana Brahaspati, Zia Fariddudin Dagar
1995 – A. Kanan
1996 – Dinkar Kaikini, Hafeez Ahmed Khan
1997 – L. K. Pandit
1998 – Puttaraj Gawaigalu, Parveen Sultana, Rajan and Sajan Mishra
1999–2000 – Ajoy Chakraborty, Rita Ganguly, Malabika Kanan
2001 – Abhay Narayan Mallick, Sangameshwar Gurav, Malini Rajurkar
2002 – Sushila Rani Patel, Sharayu Kalekar
2003 – Ghulam Mustafa Khan, Yeshwant Balkrishna Joshi
2004 – Balwant Rai Bhatt, Tejpal Singh and Surinder Singh
2005 – S. C. R. Bhat, Ramashreya Jha
2006 – Vijay Kumar Kichlu, Rashid Khan
2007 – Vidyadhar Vyas, Govardhan Mishra
2008 – Ulhas Kashalkar, M.R. Gautam
2009 – Abdul Rashid Khan, Vasundhara Komkali
2010 – Chhannulal Mishra, Yashpaul
2011 – Shruti Sadolikar, Pandit Venkatesh Kumar
2012 – Shankar Lal Mishra, Rajashekhar Mansur, Ajay Pohankar
2013 – Ritwik Sanyal, Veena Sahasrabuddhe
2014 – Ashwini Bhide-Deshpande, Iqbal Ahmad Khan, Nathrao Neralkar
2015 – Mashkoor Ali Khan
2016 – Prabhakar Karekar
2017 – Lalith J. Rao, Umakant and Ramakant Gundecha - Gundecha Brothers
2018 – Mani Prasad, Madhup Mudgal
2019 – Vinayak Torvi, Prem Kumar Mallick
2020 – Sumitra Guha, Arati Ankalikar-Tikekar
2021 – Uday Bhawalkar, Subhra Guha

Instrumental

Been/Rudra Veena/Vichitra Veena 

1969 – Dabir Khan
1977 – Asad Ali Khan
1981 – Zia Mohiuddin Dagar
1994 – Pandit Gopal Krishan
2012 – Bahauddin Dagar

Flute 
1983 – Pt. Hari Prasad Chaurasiya
1986 – Devendra Murdeshwar
1994 – Raghunath Seth
2010 – Nityanand Haldipur
2014 – Ronu Majumdar
2017 – Pt. Rajendra Prasanna
2019 – Chetan Joshi

Guitar 
2005 – Brij Bhushan Kabra

Harmonium 
2000 – Appa Jalgaonkar
2005 – Tulsidas Vasant Borkar

Pakhavaj 

1955 – Govind Rao Burhanpurkar
1965 – Sakharam Tavde
1967 – Ayodhya Prasad
1978 – Purushottam Das
1988 – Ramshankardas Pagaldas
1991 – Chatrapati Singh
1993 – Gopaldas Panse
1995 – Ram Ashish Pathak
2003 – Bhavani Shankar
2011 – Totaram Sharma
2020 – Dal Chand Sharma

Santoor 
1986 – Shivkumar Sharma
1993 – Bhajan Sopori
2018 – Tarun Bhattacharya

Sarangi 

1966 – Shakoor Khan
1975 – Ram Narayan
1976 – Gopal Misra
1986 – Sabri Khan
1988 – Hanuman Prasad Mishra
1990 – Abdul Lateef Khan
1992 – Sultan Khan
1996 – Inderlal Dhandra, Ramchandra Mishra
2008 – Ramesh Mishra
2013 – Dhruba Ghosh

Sarod 

1952 – Allauddin Khan
1953 – Hafiz Ali Khan
1963 – Ali Akbar Khan
1971 – Radhika Mohan Maitra
1986 – Sharan Rani Backliwal
1988 – Zarin Sharma
1989 – Amjad Ali Khan
1993 – Buddhadev Das Gupta
1999–2000 – Rajeev Taranath
2004 – Aashish Khan
2018 – Tejendra Majumdar

Shehnai 
1956 – Ustad Bismillah Khan
1985 – Ali Hussain Khan
1989 – Pt. Anant Lal
1996 – Pt. Raghunath Prasanna
2008 – Krishna Ram Chaudhary
2009 – Ali Ahmad Hussain
2017 – Rajendra Prasanna

Sitar 

1958 – Yusuf Ali
1960 – Wahid Khan
1962 – Pt. Ravi Shankar
1968 – Mushtaq Ali Khan
1974 – Nikhil Banerjee
1987 – Abdul Halim Jaffer Khan, Imrat Khan (also Surbahar)
1989 – Balaram Pathak
1992 – Uma Shankar Mishra
1994 – Shamim Ahmed Khan
1996 – Debu Chaudhuri
2001 – Manilal Nag
2003 – Arvind Parikh
2006 – Shahid Parvez
2010 – Budhaditya Mukherjee
2015 – Karthick Kumar
2019 – Manju Mehta
2020 – Kushal Das

Surbahar 
1991 – Annapurna Devi
2011 – Pushparaj Koshti

Tabla 

1954 – Ustad Ahmed Jan Thirakwa
1959 – Ustad Jahangir Khan
1961 – Pt. Kanthe Maharaj
1970 – Masit Khan
1976 – Karamatulla Khan
1979 – Pt. Samta Prasad
1982 – Ustad Alla Rakha
1984 – Pt. Kishan Maharaj
1990 – Ustad Zakir Hussain
1991 – Shaikh Dawood
1997 – Swapan Chaudhuri, Lalji Gokhale
1998 – Pandharinath Gangadhar Nageshkar
1999–2000 – Shankar Ghosh
2001 – Ishwar Lal Mishra
2002 – Suresh B. Gaitonde, Anindo Chatterjee
2004 – Pt. Suresh Talwalkar
2006 – Kumar Bose
2007 – Nandan Mehta
2009 – Lachman Singh Seen
2012 – Sabir Khan (Tabla)
2013 – Hashmat Ali Khan
2014 – Pt. Nayan Ghosh
2016 – Arvind Mulgaonkar
2017 – Pt. Yogesh Samsi
2021 – Ravindra Yavagal

Violin 

1972 – Gajananrao Joshi
1980 – V. G. Jog
1990 – N. Rajam
1995 – D. K. Datar
1996 – Annavarapu Rama Swamy
1997 – Sisir Kana Dhar Chowdhury
2007 – Ramoo Prasad Shastri
2016 – Kala Ramnath
2021 – Sangeeta Shankar

Carnatic music

Vocal 

1952 – Ariyakudi Ramanuja Iyengar
1953 – Semmangudi R. Srinivasa Iyer
1954 – Mysore K. Vasudevacharya
1955 – Maharajapuram Vishwanatha Iyer
1956 – M. S. Subbulakshmi
1957 – Musiri Subramania Iyer
1958 – Chembai Vaidyanatha Bhagavathar
1959 – G. N. Balasubramaniam
1960 – Madurai Mani Iyer
1961 – Mudikondan C. Venkatarama Iyer
1962 – D. K. Pattammal
1963 – B. Devendrappa
1964 – Chittoor S. Subramanyam
1965 – T. Brinda
1966 – Madurai Srirangam Iyengar
1967 – C. Venkata Rao
1968 – Alathur Srinivasa Iyer
1969 – Dandapani Desikar
1970 – M. L. Vasanthakumari
1971 – N. Channakeshaviah
1972 – T. Muktha
1973 – B.S. Raja Iyengar
1974 – M. D. Ramanathan
1975 – M. Balamurali Krishna
1976 – K.V.Narayanaswamy
1977 – Sripada Pinakapani
1978 – Madurai S. Somasundaram
1979 – R K Srikanthan
1980 – Seerkhazhi S. Govindarajan
1981 – Radha and Jayalakshmi
1982 – T. M. Thiagarajan
1983 – D. K. Jayaraman
1984 – Maharajapuram V. Santhanam
1985 – Voleti Venkatesvarulu
1986 – B. Rajam Iyer
1986 – Nedunuri Krishnamoorthy
1987 – Madurai N. Krishnan
1987 – Mani Krishnaswami
1988 – Nookala Chinna Satyanarayana
1989 – Titte Krishna Iyengar
1990 – T. V. Sankaranarayanan
1991 – S. Rajam
1992 – K. R. Kumaraswamy Iyer
1993 – Trichy Swaminathan Iyer
1994 – C. S. Krishna Iyer
1995 – R. Vedavalli
1996 – T. K. Govinda Rao
1997 – M. S. Balasubramanya Sarma
2000 – S. R. Janakiraman
2001 – B. V. Raman
2002 – T. R. Subramaniam
2003 – Trichur V. Ramachandran, M. A. Narasimhachar
2004 – Thiruvengadu A. Jayaraman, C. Saroja & C. Lalitha
2005 – S. V. Parthasarrathy, P. S. Narayanaswamy
2006 – D. Pasupathi, Chingleput Ranganathan
2007 – B. Krishnamoorti
2008 – Puranam Purushottama Sastri
2009 – Parassala B Ponnammal
2010 – Suguna Purushothaman, Mysore Nagamani Srinath
2011 – J. Venkataraman
2012 – O. S. Thyagarajan
2013 – Aruna Sairam, D. Seshchari & D. Raghavachari (Hyderabad Brothers)
2014 – Neyveli Santhanagopalan
2015 – R.N. Tharanathan, Suguna Varadachari, R.N. Thiagarajan
2016 – Neela Ramgopal, K. Omanakutty
2017 – M. S. Sheela
2018 – Alamelu Mani, Malladi Suribabu
2019 – Charumathi Ramachandran, Pala C. K. Ramachandran
2020 – R. K. Padmanabha, G. Balakrishna Prasad
2021 – Sudha Ragunathan, Radha Namboodiri

Instrumental

Clarionet 
1994 – A. K. C. Natarajan

Flute 

1954 – Palladam Sanjiva Rao
1961 – T. N. Swaminatha Pillai
1965 – T. R. Mahalingam
1984 – Natesan Ramani
1987 – T. Viswanathan
1989 – Sikkil Sisters - Kunjumani & Neela
1997 – Kesi Narayanaswamy
1999–2000 – T.S Sankaran
2004 – Prapancham Sitaram
2017 – Shashank Subramanyam
2019 – Sikkil Mala Chandrasekar

Ghatam 
1988 – Thetakudi Harihara Vinayakram
1995 – Umayalpuram K. Narayanaswamy
2011 – E. M. Subramaniam
2014 – Sukanya Ramgopal

Gottuvadhyam 
1958 – Budaloor Krishnamurthy Shastri
2006 – N. Ravikiran

Kanjira 
2001 – G. Harishankar

Mandolin 
2009 – U. Srinivas

Mridangam 

1956 – Palghat Mani Iyer
1975 – C.S. Murugabhupathy
1979 – Kolanka Venkata Raju
1983 – Palghat R. Raghu
1987 – T. K. Murthy
1990 – T. V. Gopalakrishnan
1991 – Vellore G. Ramabhadran
1992 – Umayalpuram K. Sivaraman
1994 – Dandamudi Ram Mohan Rao
1996 – Guruvayur Dorai
1998 – Karaikudi Mani
1999–2000 – V. Kamalakar Rao
2002 – Yella Venkateshwara Rao
2004 – Madras A. Kannan
2006 – Thiruvarur Bakthavathsalam
2008 – Mannargudi Easwaran
2009 – Dandamudi Sumathi Ram Mohan Rao
2010 – Srimushnam V. Raja Rao
2012 – K. V. Prasad
2013 – Trichy Sankaran
2016 – J. Vaidhyanathan
2017 – Tiruvarur Vaidyanathan
2019 – Trivandrum V Surendran
2020 – Patri Satish Kumar

Nagaswaram 

1955 – T. N. Rajarathinam Pillai
1962 – Dr. Thiruvengadu Subramania Pillai
1966 – P. S. Veeruswamy Pillai
1972 – T. S. Natarajasundaram Pillai
1976 – Sheik Chinna Moulana
1981 – Namagiripettai Krishnan
1995 – Domada Chittiabbayi
2005 – Ongale N. Rangaiah
2007 – S. R. D. Vaidyanathan
2011 – Seshampatti T Sivalingam
2013 – Thiruvizha Jayashankar
2017 – S.Kasim, S.Babu - Kasim-Babu Brothers

Saxophone 
2003 – Kadri Gopalnath

Thavil 
1985 – Valangaiman A. Shanmugasundaram Pillai
1988 – Valayapatti A. R. Subramaniam
2001 – Haridwaramangalam A. K. Palanivel
2014 – Thiruvalaputhur T A Kaliyamurthy
2021 – Thanjavur R. Govindarajan

Veena 

1952 – Karaikudi Sambasiva Iyer
1960 – L. Subramanya Sastri
1968 – K. S. Narayanaswamy
1969 – Devakottai A. Narayana Iyengar
1970 – Mysore V. Doreswamy Iyengar
1973 – Emani Sankara Sastry
1977 – S. Balachander
1980 – Thanjavur K.P. Sivanandam
1986 – Rajeswari Padmanabhan
1988 – R. Pichumani Iyer
1990 – Chitti Babu
1992 – M. K. Kalyanakrishna Bhagavathar
1993 – Kalpakam Swaminathan
2001 – R. N. Doreswamy
2002 – E. Gayathri
2007 – Vidya Shankar
2011 – Ayyagari Syamasundaram
2017 – Suma Sudhindra
2021 – D. Balakrishnan

Violin 

1953 – Dwaram Venkataswamy Naidu
1957 – Tirumakudalu Chowdiah
1959 – Kumbakonam Rajamanickam Pillai
1963 – T. K. Jayarama Iyer
1964 – K. N. Chinnaswamy Iyer
1967 – K. S. Venkataramiah 'Papa'
1971 – Madurai S. Subramanya Iyer
1974 – T. N. Krishnan
1978 – Lalgudi Jayaraman
1982 – M. S. Gopalakrishnan
1986 – M. Chandrasekaran
1988 – Chalakudy N. S. Narayanaswamy
1989 – R. K. Venkatarama Sastry
1991 – Kandadevi S. Alagiriswamy
1993 – Kunnakudi Vaidyanathan
1996 – Annavarapu Ramaswamy
1997 – T. Rukmini
1998 – M. S. Anantharaman
1999–2000 – R. R. Keshavamurthy
2003 – A. Kanyakumari
2005 – V. V. Subrahmanyam
2008 – B. Sasikumar
2010 – Nagai Muralidharan
2012 – Mysore M. Nagaraja
2014 – Dwaram Durga Prasad Rao
2015 – Lalgudi G. J. R. Krishnan
2016 – Mysore Manjunath
2018 – Ganesh and Kumaresh
2020 – M. A. Sundareswaran

Creative and experimental music 

1973 – Vishnudas Shirali
1976 – Timir Baran Bhattacharya
1978 – Rai Chand Boral
1982 – Vijay Raghav Rao
1983 – Chidambaram S. Jayaraman
1986 – Anil Biswas
1986 – M. B. Srinivasan
1986 – Hemanta Kumar Mukhopadhyay
1988 – Bhaskar Chandavarkar
1989 – Vanraj Bhatia
1990 – L. Subramaniam
1994 – V. Balsara
1995 – Atul Desai
1997 – Satish Bhatia
1998 – Vishwa Mohan Bhatt
2001 – S. Rajaram
2002 – K. P. Udayabhanu
2007 – Khayyam
2012 – Ilaiyaraaja
2020 – Bickram Ghosh

Folk music
2022 – Mahavir Nayak

Other major traditions of music 
2008 – Ningombam Ibobi Singh (Nata Sankirtana, Manipur)
2009 – L. Ibohalmacha Singh (Nata Sankirtana, Manipur)
2010 – M.V. Simhachala Sastry (Harikatha, Tirupathi)
2011 – Gopal Chandra Panda (Odissi Music)
2012 – Bhai Balbir Singh Ragi (Gurbani)
2013 – Bankim Sethi (Odissi Music)
2018 – Suresh Wadkar (Sugam Sangeet), Shanti Hiranand (Sugam Sangeet), H. Ashangbi Devi (Nata Sankirtana, Manipur)
2019 – O. S. Arun (Sugam Sangeet), Sharma Bandhu (Sugam Sangeet), D. Uma Maheshwari (Harikatha)
2020 – Anup Jalota (Sugam Sangeet), N. Irabot Singh (Nata Sankirtana)
2021 – Susmita Das (Sugam Sangeet), H. R. Leelavathi (Sugam Sangeet), Kumud Diwan (Thumri)

Dance

Bharatanatyam 

1955 – T. Balasaraswati
1957 – Rukmini Devi Arundale
1959 – Mylapore Gouri Amma
1962 – R. Muthurathnambal
1965 – P. Chockkalingam Pillai
1966 – Vazhuvoor B. Ramiah Pillai, Swarnasaraswathi
1968 – Kamala
1969 – T. K. Swaminatha Pillai
1970 – Shanta Rao
1971 – T. Chandrakanthamma
1972 – Sikkil Ramaswami Pillai
1973 – Kumbakonam K. Bhanumathi
1974 – K. P. Kittappa Pillai
1976 – M. Muthiah Pillai
1977 – Yamini Krishnamurthy
1979 – Pandanallur Subbaraya Pillai
1981 – Indrani Rahman
1982 – Vyjayanthimala
1983 – Padma Subramanyam
1984 – Subramaniam Sarada, Sudharani Raghupathy
1985 – T. K. Mahalingam Pillai
1986 – Krishnaveni Lakshmanan
1987 – U. S. Krishna Rao and Chandrabhaga Devi, Chitra Viswaswaran
1989 – V. S. Muthuswamy Pillai
1990 – Kalanidhi Narayanan
1991 – Adyar K. Lakshman
1992 – K. J. Sarasa
1993 – Guru Kubernath Tanjorkar(Tanjavurkar), C. V. Chandrasekhar
1994 – V. P. Dhananjayan and Shanta Dhananjayan
1995 – M. K. Saroja, Indira Rajan
1996 – Sarada Hoffman
1997 – Kanaka Srinivasan
1998 – Lakshmi Viswanathan
1999–2000 – K. Kalyanasundaram Pillai, Leela Samson, H. R. Keshava Murthy
2001 – Alarmel Valli, Pratibha Prahlad
2002 – Malavika Sarukkai
2003 – C. K. Balagopalan
2004 – Nirmala Ramachandran
2005 – R. Rhadha
2006 – S. Narmada
2007 – Sucheta Bhide Chapekar
2008 – Saroja Vaidyanathan
2009 – Ananda Shankar Jayant
2011 – Narthaki Nataraj (First Transgender to receive SN Akademi Award)
2012 – Priyadarsini Govind
2013 – Jamuna Krishnan, B. Herabhanathan
2014 – Adayar Janardanan
2015 – Ranganayaki Jayaraman
2016 – Geeta Chandran 
2017 – Rama Vaidyanathan
2018 – Radha Sridhar
2019 – Vasundhara Doraswamy
2020 – Meenakshi Chitharanjan
2021 – Jayalakshmi Eshwar

Chhau 

1963 – Sudhendra Narayan Singh Deo (Seraikella)
1971 – Ananta Charan Sai (Mayurbhanj)
1975 – Krishna Chandra Naik (Mayurbhanj)
1981 – Kedar Nath Sahoo (Seraikella)
1982 – Gambhir Singh Mura (Purulia)
1987 – Madan Mohan Lenka (Mayurbhanj)
1988 – Srihari Nayak (Mayurbhanj)
1990 – Bikram Kumbhakar (Seraikella)
1991 – Chandra Sekhar Bhanj (Mayurbhanj)
2004 – Shashadhar Acharya
2012 – Jai Narayan Samal
2014 – Jagru Mahato
2015 – Sadashiva Pradhan
2016 – Gopal Prasad Dubey
2017 – Janmajay Saibabu
2018 – Tapan Kumar Pattanayak (Seraikella)
2019 – Brajendra Kumar Pattnaik
2020 – Trilochan Mohanta
2021 – Bhuvan Kumar

Creative dance/Choreography 

1960 – Uday Shankar
1970 – Mrinalini Sarabhai
1976 – Narendra Sharma 
1979 – Prabhat Ganguli
1980 – R. K. Priyagopal Sana
1981 – Parvati Kumar
1984 – Rajkumar Singhajit Singh
1989 – Maya Rao
1991 – Chandralekha
1992 – Sachin Shankar
1993 – Manjusri Chaki Sircar
1995 – Astad Deboo
1999–2000 Mallika Sarabhai
2001 – Gul Bardhan
2002 – Sambhu Bhattacharya
2005 – Th. Chaotombi Singh
2006 – Gorima Hazarika
2008 – Yogsunder Desai
2009 – Daksha Sheth
2010 – Uttara Asha Coorlawala
2011 – Tanushree Shankar
2014 – Navtej Singh Johar
2015 – W. Lokendrajit Singh 
2016 – Anita Ratnam
2018 – Deepak Mazumdar
2019 – Mamata Shankar
2020 – Bhushan Lakhandri

Kathak 

1955 – Shambhu Maharaj
1957 – Baijnath Prasad "Lacchu Maharaj"
1959 – Sunder Prasad
1962 – Mohanrao Kallianpurkar
1964 – Birju Maharaj
1968 – Damayanti Joshi
1969 – Sitara Devi
1974 – Gauri Shankar Devilal Kathak
1975 – Roshan Kumari
1979 – Rohini Bhate
1982 – Kartik Ram, Kumudini Lakhia
1984 – Durga Lal
1987 – Uma Sharma
1991 – Reba Vidyarthi
1995 – Ramlal Bareth
1996 – Rani Karnaa
1998 – Sunderlal Sathyanarayan Gangani
1999–2000 – Shovana Narayan
2000 – Surendra Saikia
2002 – Rajendra Gangani
2003 – Sunayana Hazarilal Agarwal, Urmila Nagar
2004 – Saswati Sen
2005 – Tirath Ram Azad
2006 – Munna Shukla
2007 – Geetanjali Lal
2008 – Shashi Sankhla
2009 – Prerana Shrimali
2010 – Malabika Mitra
2011 – Manjushree Chatterjee
2012 – Vijay Shankar
2013 – Rajashree Shirke
2014 – Uma Dogra
2016 – Jitendra Maharaj
2017 – Shobha Koser
2018 – Maulik Shah, Ishira Parikh
2019 – Raghav Raj Bhatt & Mangala Bhatt
2020 – Kumkum Dhar
2021 – Shama Bhate

Kathakali 

1956 – Guru Kunchu Kurup
1958 – Thotton K. Chandu Panikkar
1961 – Thekinkatti Ramunni Nair
1963 – Chenganoor Raman Pillai
1965 – Guru Gopinath
1967 – Kalamandalam Krishnan Nair
1968 – Kurichi Kunjan Panickar
1969 – Vazhenkada Kunchu Nair
1970 – M. Vishnu Namboodiri
1971 – Kudamaloor Karunakaran Nair
1972 – M. Madhava Panicker
1973 – Velinezhi K. Nanu Nayar
1973 – Kavungal Chathunni Panicker
1974 – Kalamandalam Ramankutty Nair
1975 – K. Sankarankutty Panicker
1983 – Champakulam Pachu Pillai
1985 – Mankompu Sivasankara Pillai
1987 – Kalamandalam Gopi
1988 – Keezhpadam Kumaran Nair
1989 – Oyoor Kochugovinda Pillai
1991 – Chennithala Chellapan Pillai
1993 – Kalamandalam Padmanabhan Nair
1996 – Kottakkal Krishnan Kutty Nair
1997 – Madavoor Vasudevan Nair
1998 – Kottakkal Sivaraman
1999–2000 – Nelliyode Vasudevan Namboodiri
2003 – Sadanam P. V. Balakrishnan
2004 – Kalamandalam Vasu Pisharody
2005 – Mathoor Govindan Kutty
2006 – Kottakkal Chandrasekharan
2007 – Sadanam Krishnankutty
2008 – Kalamandalam Kuttan
2009 – Kalamandalam Rajan
2010 – Kalamandalam K. G. Vasudevan
2011 – Thonnakkal Peethambaran
2012 – Vazhengada Vijayan
2013 – Kalamandalam M. P. S. Namboodiri
2015 – K. Kunhiraman Nair
2016 – Kalamandalam Ramachandran Unnithan
2017 – Madambi Subramanian Namboodiri
2019 – Kottakkal Nandakumaran Nair
2021 – Inchakkattu Ramachandran Pillai

Kuchipudi 

1961 – Vedantam Satyanarayana Sarma ‘Satyam’
1968 – Chinta Krishnamurthy
1978 – C. Ramacharyalu
1981 – Vempati Chinna Satyam
1983 – Nataraja Ramakrishna (also Bharatanatyam)
1985 – Vedantam Prahlada Sarma
1987 – Pasumarthi Venugopala Krishna Sarma
1990 – Shobha Naidu
1991 – Raja Reddy and Radha Reddy
1993 – Josyula Seetharamaiah
1994 – Vedantam Parvateesam
1998 – Veernala Jayarama Rao and Banashree Rao
1999–2000 – Swapnasundari Rao
2003 – K. Uma Rama Rao
2004 – Pasumarthi Seetha Ramiah
2005 – Korada Narasimha Rao
2006 – Pasumarthi Rathiah Sarma
2007 – Yelesarapu Nageswara Sarma
2008 – Vasanta Lakshmi and Narasimhachari
2009 – Vyjayanthi Kashi
2010 – Ratna Kumar
2011 – Alekhya Punjala
2012 – Vedantam Ramalinga Sastry
2013 – Chinta Seetha Ramanjaneyulu
2014 – Vedantam Radhesyam
2015 – Gaddam Padmaja Reddy
2016 – A B Bala Kondala Rao 
2017 – Deepika Reddy
2018 – Pasumurthy Ramalinga Sastry
2019 – Manju Barggavee
2020 – Pasumarthy Vithal and Bharathi Vithal
2021 – N. Sailaja

Manipuri 

1956 – Maisnam Amubi Singh
1958 – Haobam Atomba Singh
1961 – T. Amudon Sharma
1963 – Atombapu Sharma
1965 – Guru Bipin Singh
1969 – Ojha Thangjam Chaoba Singh
1972 – Kshetri Tombi Devi
1973 – L. Koireng Singh
1974 – L. Ibemhal Devi
1975 – Rajani Maibi
1976 – Ojha Maibam Ibungohal Singh
1977 – Nayana Susheel Jhaveri
1980 – L. Thouranishabi Devi
1982 – L. Tombi Devi
1985 – Khaidem Lokeshwar Singh
1987 – Tarun Kumar Singh
1988 – Ibopishak Sharma
1990 – Th. Babu Singh
1993 – H. Ngangbi Devi
1994 – T. Nadia Singh
1995 – L. Thambalngoubi Devi
1996 – Darshana Jhaveri
1997 – Samanduram Tondon Devi
1998 – N. Madhabi Devi
1999–2000 – Sorokhaibam Naran Singh
2001 – Charu Sija Mathur
2002 – K. Ongbi Leipaklotpi Devi
2003 – Thiyam Suryamukhi Devi, Kalavati Devi
2005 – K. Radhamohon Sharma
2009 – L. Bino Devi
2010 – Phanjoubam Iboton Singh
2011 – Priti Patel
2014 – N. Amusana Devi
2016 – Maisnam Kaminikumar Singh 
2017 – L.N. Oinam Ongdi Doni Devi
2018 – Akham Lakshmi Devi
2020 – Sruti Bandopadhay
2021 – Thokchom Ibemubi Devi

Mohiniattam 

1972 – T. Chinnammu Amma
1978 – Kalamandalam Kalyanikutty Amma
1994 – Kalamandalam Satyabhama
1998 – Kalamandalam Kshemavathy
1999–2000 – Bharati Shivaji
2004 – Kalamandalam Sugandhi
2006 – Kalamandalam Vimala Menon
2007 – Deepti Omchery Bhalla
2008 – Kalamandalam Leelamma
2011 – V. K. Hymavathy
2015 – Mandakini Trivedi 
2018 – Gopika Varma
2019 – Nirmala Paniker
2021 – Neena Prasad

Odissi 

1966 – Kelucharan Mohapatra
1970 – Pankaj Charan Das
1976 – Sanjukta Panigrahi (joint award with Raghunath Panigrahi for Odissi music)
1977 – Deba Prasad Das
1985 – Mayadhar Raut
1986 – Priyambada Mohanty Hejmadi
1987 – Sonal Mansingh
1992 – D. N. Pattnaik
1994 – Kumkum Mohanty
1995 – Raghunath Dutta
1997 – Gangadhar Pradhan
1999–2000 – Minati Mishra, Madhavi Mudgal
2002 – Kiran Segal
2003 – Hare Krishna Behera
2004 – Durllav Chandra Singh
2005 – Durga Charan Ranbir
2006 – Surendra Nath Jena
2007 – Ranjana Gauhar
2008 – Ramani Ranjan Jena
2009 – Geeta Mahalik
2010 – Aruna Mohanty
2011 – Ramli Ibrahim
2012 – Sharmila Biswas
2013 – Sangeeta Dash
2014 – Sudhakar Sahoo
2015 – Aloka Kanungo
2016 – Ratikant Mohapatra
2017 – Sujata Mohapatra
2018 – Surupa Sen
2019 – Sutapa Talukdar
2020 – Rabindra Atibudhi

Sattriya 

1963 – Maniram Datta Moktar
1978 – Bapuram Bayan Attai
1980 – Roseshwar Saikia Bayan Moktar
1996 – Indira P. P. Bora 
1998 – Pradip Chaliha
1999–2000 – Parmanand Borbayan
2001 – Ghanakanta Bora
2004 – Jatin Goswami
2007 – Ganakanta Dutta Borbayan
2010 – Manik Borbayan
2013 – Jogen Dutta Bayan
2014 – Anita Sharma
2015 – Sarodi Saikia
2016 – Haricharan Bhuyan Borbayan 
2017 – Ramkrishna Talukdar
2018 – Tankeswar Hazarika Borbayan
2019 – Ranjumoni Saikia

Other major traditions of dance and dance theatre 
2007 – Kalamandalam Sivan Namboodiri (Kutiyattam)
2009 – Kala Krishna (Andhranatyam)
2010 – Painkulam Rama Chakyar (Kutiyattam)
2012 – Painkulam Damodara Chakyar (Kutiyattam)
2013 – Srinivasa Rangachariar (Arayer Sevai)
2021 – Kalamandalam Girija (Kutiyattam)

Music for dance 

2005 – Josyula Krishna Murthy (Kuchipudi Bhagavatha Maddalla)
2006 – Kalamandalam Gangadharan (Kathakali Pattu)
2008 – Ramhari Das (Odissi)
2010 – S. Rajeswari (Bharatanatyam)
2011 – Karaikudi Krishnamurthi
2012 – Jwala Prasad
2013 – Dhaneshwar Swain
2014 – Varanasi Vishnu Namboothiri (Kathakali)
2015 – Rajkumar Bharathi
2017 – Ashit Desai
2020 – Prema Ramamurthy, Arambam Tombinou Devi
2021 – Bijay Kumar Jena

Folk and Tribal dance
2017 – Mukund Nayak

Theatre

Acting

From 1952–2003 (language-wise)

Assamese 
1961 – Mitradev Mahanta Adhikari
2001 – Girish Chowdhury

Bengali theatre 

1958 – Ahindra Choudhury
1962 – Tripti Mitra
1967 – Sabitabrata Dutta
1970 – Saraju Bala Devi
1973 – Shobha Sen
1975 – Molina Devi
1977 – Krishna Roy
1983 – Kumar Roy
1989 – Sekhar Chatterjee
1995 – Satya Bandopadhyay
1998 – Soumitra Chatterjee
1999–2000 – Ketaki Dutta Sabitri Chatterjee
2003 – Shaoli Mitra

Gujarati theatre 

1960 – Ashraf Khan
1965 – Muljibhai Khushalbhai Nayak
1968 – Jashwant Thaker
1974 – Pransukh Manilal Nayak
1980 – Dina Pathak (Gandhi) 
1988 – Sarita Joshi

Hindi theatre 

1979 – Amrish Puri
1982 – Manohar Singh
1984 – Uttara Baokar
1985 – Fida Hussain
1989 – Surekha Sikri
1990– Naseeruddin Shah (also Urdu)
1999–2000 – Seema Biswas

Kannada 

1955 – Gubbi Veeranna
1961 – Subbaiah Naidu
1985 – B. Jayamma
1992 – R. Nagarathnamma
1994 – Balappa Yenagi
1996 – B. Jayashree
2003 – C. R. Simha

Malayalam 
1960 – C. I. Parameswaran Pillai
1965 – V. T. Aravindaksha Menon
1969 – N. N. Pillai

Manipuri 
1991 – Sabitri Heisnam
1997 – R. K. Bhogen

Marathi theatre 

1955 – Narayan Rao Rajhans 'Bal Gandharva'
1956 – Ganesh Govind Bodas
1957 – Chintaman Ganesh Kolhatkar
1960 – Gopal Govind Pathak
1964 – Keshav Trimbak Date
1971 – Shreeram Lagoo
1976 – Jyotsna Bhole
1978 – Dattaram N. Walwaikar
1981 – Chintamani Govind Pendse
1983 – Dattatray Ramachandra Bhat
1986 – Prabhakar V. Panshikar
1987 – Sulabha Deshpande (also Hindi)
1988 – Saudagar Nagnath Gore 'Chhota Gandharva'
1990 – Bhakti Barve Inamdar
1991 – Neelu Phule
1996 – Mohan Agashe

Oriya 
1961 – Samuel Sahu

Sanskrit 
1965 – Krishnachandra Moreshwar "Daji Bhatawadekar"

Tamil 
1959 – Pammal Sambandha Mudaliar
1962 – T. K. Shanmugam
1967 – S. V. Sahasranamam
1992 – Poornam Viswanathan

Telugu theatre 
1961 – Sthanam Narasimha Rao
1963 – Banda Kanakalingeswara Rao
1973 – Kalyanam Raghuramaiah
1986 – Peesapati Narasimha Murty

Urdu 
1963 – Zohra Sehgal
1994 – Uzra Butt

From 2004 onwards 

2004 – Rohini Hattangady, Ramcharan Nirmalkar
2005 – Chindodi Leela
2006 – Dharani Barman, Gita Dey, K. Kaladharan Nair
2007 – Ramesh Mehta
2008 – Markand Bhatt, Arundhati Nag
2009 – Sudha Shivpuri, Neeta Mohindra
2010 – Dilip Prabhavalkar, Banwari Taneja, Maya Krishna Rao, Swatilekha Sengupta
2012 – Parvesh Seth, Nirmal Rishi, Purisai Kannappa Sambandan
2013 – Vasant Josalkar, Kusum Haidar
2014 – Debshankar Haldar, Ramdas Kamat
2017 – Anil Tickoo
2018 – Suhas Joshi, Teekam Joshi
2019 – Alok Chatterjee, Pranjal Saikia
2020 – Prashant Damle, Bhupesh Joshi, Amit Banerjee
2021 – Neeleshwar Mishra, Y. G. Mahendran

Mime 
1993 – Jogesh Dutta
2002 – Niranjan Goswami
2009 – Moinul Haque
2018 – Swapan Nandy
2021 – Vilas Janve

Direction 

 1957 – Jaishankar Bhojak 'Sundari'
 1959 – Sombhu Mitra
 1961 – Kasambhai Nathubhai Mir
 1962 – Ebrahim Alkazi
 1964 – T. S. Rajamanikkam
 1969 – Habib Tanvir
 1970 – Adi Ferozeshah Marzban
 1971 – Satyadev Dubey
 1972 – Shyamanand Jalan
 1973 – Ajitesh Bandopadhyay
 1974 – Damodar Kashinath Kenkre
 1975 – Vijaya Mehta
 1976 – B. V. Karanth
 1977 – Rajinder Nath
 1978 – Jabbar Patel
 1979 – B. M. Shah
 1980 – Rudraprasad Sengupta
 1981 – R. S. Manohar
 1982 – Sheila Bhatia
 1983 – Kavalam Narayana Panikkar
 1985 – Heisnam Kanhailal
 1986 – Alyque Padamsee
 1987 – Tarun Roy
 1987 – Ratan Thiyam
 1989 – Bibhash Chakraborty
 1990 – Geoffrey Kendal & Laura Kendal (Joint Award)
 1991 – Fritz Bennewitz
 1992 – Mohan Maharishi
 1993 – Kailash Pandya
 1993 – Barry John
 1995 – M. K. Raina
 1995 – Bansi Kaul
 1996 – Purushottam Darwhekar
 1997 – Bhanu Bharti
 1998 – Amal Allana
 1998 – Dulal Roy
 1998 – Usha Ganguly
 1999–2000 – Balwant Thakur
 1999–2000 – Nadira Zaheer Babbar
 1999–2000 – Prasanna
 2001 – Shanta Gandhi
 2002 – Arun Mukherjee, Satish Anand
 2003 – Devendra Raj Ankur, Neelam Mansingh Chowdhry
 2004 – Anuradha Kapur, Arambam Lokendra Singh, Raj Besaria
 2005 – Ranjit Kapoor, V K Sharma
 2006 – E. Joychandra Singh, R. Nagesh, Amitava Dasgupta
 2007 – Hari Madhab Mukherjee, N.C. Thakur
 2008 – S. Ramanujam, Probir Guha
 2009 – Joy Michael, Dinesh Thakur
 2010 – Veenapani Chawla, Urmil Kumar Thapliyal
 2011 – Alakhnandan, Kirti Jain
 2012 – Tripurari Sharma, Waman Kendre
 2013 – Kamalkar Muralidhar Sontakke, Kewal Dhaliwal, Prasanna Ramaswamy
 2014 – Surya Mohan Kulshreshtha, Chidambar Rao Jambe
 2015 – Parvez Akhtar, Mushtaq Kak
 2016 – Satyabrata Rout, Rajkamal Nayak
 2018 – Sanjay Upadhyay, S. Raghunandana
 2019 – Bharti Sharma, Kumar Sohoni, Abinash Sarma
 2020 – Lokendra Trivedi, Mithilesh Rai
 2021 – R. Venugopal Rao (Surabhi), Lalit Singh Pokharia, Sudesh Sharma, Ajay Malkani, Manoj Pattnaik

Playwriting 
Assamese
1986 – Satya Prasad Barua
2003 – Aruna Sarma
Bengali
1968 – Badal Sircar
1969 – Manmatha Ray
1975 – Bijon Bhattacharya
1985 – Manoj Mitra
1991 – Mohit Chattopadhyaya
Dogri
2008 – Narsingh Dev Jamwal
Gujarati
1961 – Prabhulal Dayaram Dwivedi
1971 – C. C. Mehta, Pragji Dossa
Hindi
1965 – Upendra Nath Ashk
1968 – Mohan Rakesh
1977 – Lakshmi Narain Lal
1988 – Dharamvir Bharati
1992 – Surendra Verma
2001 – Bhisham Sahni, D.P. Sinha
2006 – Prabhat Kumar Bhattacharya
2004 – Swadesh Deepak
2007 – Reoti Sharan Sharna
2008 – Mudra Rakshasa
Kannada
1963 – Adya Rangacharya 'Shriranga'
1972 – Girish Karnad
1983 – Chandrashekhara Kambara
1980 – Narasinga Rao Parwathavani
1989 – G. B. Joshi
1997 – H. S. Shivaprakash
Kashmiri
1997 – Moti Lal Kemmu
Malayalam
1979 – G. Sankara Pillai
1983 – Kavalam Narayana Panikkar
1986 – K. T. Muhammed
1997 – N. Krishna Pillai
2009 – Vayala Vasudevan Pillai
Manipuri
2007 – Yumnam Rajendra Singh
Marathi
1958 – B.V. 'Mama' Warerkar
1967 – P. L. Deshpande
1970 – Vijay Tendulkar
1976 – C. T. Khanolkar
1982 – M.G. Rangnekar
1984 – Vasant Shankar Kanetkar
1987 – V.V. Shirwadkar
1989 – Mahesh Elkunchwar
1994 – Satish Alekar
1996 – G.P. Deshpande
2003 – Ratnakar Ramkrishna Matkari
2009 – Shankar Narayan Navre
Mizo
2007 – Lathangfala Sailo
Oriya
1981 – Manoranjan Das
1982 – Biswajit Das
1987 – Gopal Chhotray
Punjabi
1993 – Gursharan Singh
1998 – Balwant Gargi
2010 – Atamjeet Singh
Tamil
1974 – S.D. Sundaram
1999–2000 – Na. Muthuswamy
2004 – Indira Parthasarathy
Telugu
2010 – D. Vizai Bhaskar

2012 onwards 
2012 – Arjun Deo Charan
2013 – Rameshwar Prem, Pundalik Narayan Naik
2014 – Asgar Wajahat
2018 – Rajiv Naik, Laltluangliana Khiangte
2019 – Hrishikesh Sulabh

Allied Theatre Arts 
Lighting
1974 – Tapas Sen
1977 – V, Ramamurthy
1989 – G.N. Dasgupta
1994 – Kanishka Sen
1997 – Mansukh Joshi (for scenic design also)
1999–2000 – R.K. Dhingra
2002 – Ashok Sagar Bhagat
2003 – Sreenivas G. Kappanna
2005 – Suresh Bhardwaj
2006 - Gautam Bhattacharya
2011 – Kamal Jain
2019 – Souti Chakraborty
2020 – Raghav Prakash
Scenic Design
1985 – Goverdhan Panchal
1986 – Khaled Choudhury
1988 – Dattatraya Ganesh Godse
1997 – Mansukh Joshi
1999–2000 – Robin Das
2007 – Mahendra Kumar
Costumes/Make-up
1981 – Ashok Srivastava (Make-up)
1990 – Roshan Alkazi (Costume Design)
1999–2000 – Shakti Sen (Make-up)
2001 – Dolly Ahluwalia (Costume Design)
2003 – Anant Gopal Shinde (Make-up)
2004 – Prema Karanth (Costume Design)
2008 – Amba Sanyal (Costume Designing)
2009 – Kamal Arora (Make-up)
2013 – Krishna Borkar (Make-up)
2019 – N.K. Ramakrishna (Make-up)
2020 – M. Purushottam (Costume Design)
Music for Theatre
1999–2000 – Kajal Ghosh, Kamal Tewari
2005 - R. Paramashivan
2009 – Kuldeep Singh
2012 - Murari Roychoudhury
2014 - Amod Bhatt, Amardas Manikpuri (Chhattisgarh)
Stagecraft
1993 – M.S. Sathyu
1995 – N. Krishnamoorthy
2002 – Nissar Allana
2005 – H. V. Sharma
2020 – N. Jadumani Singh

Major traditions of theatre 
2007 – Kolyur Ramachandra Rao (Yakshagana)
2008 – Bansi Lal Khiladi, Khayal (Rajasthan)
2012 – Ghulam Rasool Bhagat (Bhand Pather)
2014 – Manjunath Bhagwat Hostota (Yakshagana)
2018 – Bhagawat A. S. Nanjappa (Yakshagana), A. M. Parameswaran Kuttan Chakkiyar (Kutiyattam)
2019 – K. S. Krishanappa (Isai Natakam)
2020 – P. P. Kandaswami (Therukoothu)
2021 – Gunindra Nath Ojah (Music and Direction in Ankiya Bhaona)

Other Traditional / Folk/ Tribal/ Dance/ Music/ Theatre and Puppetry

 1964 – Mani Madhava Chakyar (Kutiyattam), Kerala
 1969 – Gahan Chandra Goswami (Ankia Nat, Assam)
 1972 – Kudamaloor Karunakaran Nair (Kathakali), Kerala
 1976 – Raghunath Panigrahi (Joint Award with Sanjukta Panigrahi for Odissi Music, Orissa)
 1981 – Kamini Kumar Narzary (Bodo Tribal Dance, Assam)
 1983 – Dharmiklal Chunilal Pandya (Akhyana), Gujarat
 1983 – Lalit Chandra Ojha (Ojapali and Deodhani Dances, Assam)
 1984 – Balakrushna Dash (Odissi Music, Orissa)
 1985 – Mohan Chandra Barman (Bhaona, Assam)
 1984 – Bhubaneswar Mishra (Odissi Music, Orissa)
 1987 – Bhupen Hazarika (Folk Music, Assam) 
 1988 – Pratima Barua Pandey (Folk Music, Assam)
 1989 – Rajen Pam (Tribal Music, Assam) 
 1990 – Rameshwar Pathak (Folk Music, Assam) 
 1991 – Puranchand Wadali & Pyarelal Wadali (Folk Music), Punjab
 1992 – Khagen Mahanta (Folk Music, Assam)
 1994 – M. Boyer (Tiatr), Goa
 1995 – Teejan Bai (Pandavani), Madhya Pradesh
 1997 – Arghya sen [(Rabindra Sangeet), West Bengal
 1997 – P. R. Thilagam, Kuravanji performer, Tamil Nadu
 1998 – Ghulam Mohammad Saznawaz, Jammu and Kashmir
 2002 – Dilip Sarma & Sudakshina Sarma (Jyoti Sangeet, Assam - Joint Award)
 2003 – Prabhat Sarma (traditional & Folk Music, Assam)
 2003 – Kosha Kanta Deva Goswami (Mask Making Bhaona, Assam)
 2003 – Banamali Maharana (Odissi Music, Orissa)
 2005 – Khirod Khakhlari (Bodo Dance & Music, Assam)
 2005 – Kashinath Pujapanda (Odissi Music, Orissa)
 2005 – Mathoor Govindan Kutty (Kathakali), Kerala
 2007 – Subodh Debbarma (Folk dance), Tripura
 2007 – Amar Pal (Folk Song), West Bengal
 2008 – Kartar Singh (Gurbani), Punjab
 2008 – Mangi Bai Arya (Mand), Rajasthan
 2008 – Lakha Khan Mangniyar, (Folk Music), Rajasthan
 2008 – Bansi Lal Khilari (Khayal), Rajasthan
 2009 – Bhikhudan Gadhvi (Folk music), Gujarat 
 2010 – Harbhajan Singh Namdhari (Gurbani Kirtan), Punjab
 2010 – Nazeer Ahmed Khan Warsi and Naseer Ahmed Khan Warsi (Qawwali), Andhra Pradesh
 2010 – Dwijen Mukherjee (Rabindra Sangeet),  West Bengal
 2010 – Chandabai Tiwadi (Bharud), Maharashtra
 2010 – T. Somasundaram (Folk dance), Tamil Nadu
 2010 – Krishna Kumari (Folk music: Bhakha), Jammu and Kashmir
 2010 – Chand Jagdish Tiwadi (Folk theatre: Bharud), Maharashtra
 2011 – Trippekulam Achuta Marar, Kerala
 2011 – Hemant Chauhan (Folk Music), Gujarat
 2011 – Gurmeet Bawa (Folk Music), Punjab
 2011 – Kashiram Sahu (Folk Theatre), Chhattisgarh
 2011 – Mipham Otsal (Traditional Theatre), Jammu & Kashmir
 2011 – Bellagallu Veeranna (Togalu Gombeyatta, Puppetry), Karnataka
 2011 – Gopal Chandra Das (Putul Nach), Tripura
 2011 – Kasmi Khan Niyazi (Making of musical Instrument), DeIhi
 2012 – Go Ru Channabasappa (Folk Music - Karnataka)
 2012 – Kinaram Nath Oja (Suknani Ojapali - Assam)
 2012 – Prem Singh Dehati (Folk Music - Haryana)
 2012 – Sulochana Chavan (Lavani - Maharashtra)
 2012 – Mattannur Sankaran Kutty Marar (Thayambaka - Kerala)
 2012 – Govind Ram Nirmalkar (Nacha - Chhattisgarh)
 2012 – Heera Das Negi (Mask Making - Himachal Pradesh)
 2013 – Meeenakshi K. (Instrument Making - Ghatam - Tamil Nadu)
 2013 – Raj Begum, Traditional, Folk Music/Dance & Theatre (Jammu & Kashmir)
 2013 – T.A.R. Nadi Rao & N Jeeva Rao (Joint Award), Folk Music (Tamil Nadu)
 2013 – Gurdial Singh, Instrument Making (Punjab)
 2013 – Mohan Singh Khangura, Rabindra Sangeet (West Bengal) 
 2013 – Umakanta Gogoi (Bairagi), Tokari Geet and Dehbichar Geet, (Assam)
 2013 – Sheikh Riyajuddin alias Rajubaba, Folk Theatre (Maharashtra)
 2014 – Puran Shah Koti (Traditional Music - Punjab)
 2014 – Kalamandalam Ram Mohan (Makeup/Costume for Kathakali)
 2014 – Reba Kanta Mohanta (Mask Making - Assam)
 2014 – Abdul Rashid Hafiz (Folk Music - Jammu & Kashmir )
 2014 – K.Shanathoiba Sharma (Thang-Ta - Manipur)
 2014 – Ramdayal Sharma (Nautanki - U.P.)
 2014 – Thanga Darlong (Folk Music - Tripura)
 2015 – Ramchandra Singh (Folk Theater - Bihar)
 2017 – Mukund Nayak (Folk Music - Jharkhand)
 2017 – Prakash Khandge (Folk Arts - Maharashtra)
 2018 – Malini Awasthi (Folk Music - Uttar Pradesh)
 2018 – Gazi Khan Barna (Folk Music - Khartal, Rajasthan)
 2018 – Narendra Singh Negi (Folk Songs - Uttarakhand)
 2018 – Niranjan Rajyaguru (Folk Music - Gujarat)
 2018 – Mohd. Sadiq Bhagat (Folk Theatre - Bhand Pather, J&K)
 2018 – Kota Sachidanand Shastry (Harikatha - Andhra Pradesh)
 2018 – Arjun Singh Dhurve (Folk Dance - Madhya Pradesh)
 2018 – Somnath Battu (Folk Music - Himachal Pradesh)
 2018 – Hem Chandra Goswami (Mask Making - Assam)
 2019 – Mamta Chandrakar (Folk Music Chhattisgarh)
 2019 – Ram Lal (Folk Music, Uttarakhand)
 2019 – Shankarbhai Hakabhai Dharjiya (Folk Music & Dance - Gujarat)
 2019 – Nathulal Solanki (Folk Music - Rajasthan)
 2019 – Pandurang Ghotkar (Folk Music - Maharashtra)
 2019 – Peruvanam Kuttan Marar (Thayambaka - Kerala)
 2019 – Urmila Pandey (Folk Music - Madhya Pradesh)
 2019 – Sayed Mohmmed P.P. (Folk Music & Dance - Lakshadweep)
 2019 – Majid Gulabsaheb Sitarmaker (Instrument Making - Maharashtra)
 2019 – Dulal Kanji (Instrument Making - West Bengal)
 2020 – Balkar Sidhu (Folk Dance - Punjab)
 2020 – Nandlal Garg (Folk Music - Himachal Pradesh)
 2020 – B. Lalthlengliana (Folk Theatre - Mizoram)
 2020 – Ranjana Kumri Jha (Folk Music - Bihar)
 2020 – S. G. Lakshmidevamma (Folk Music - Karnataka)
 2020 – Tarubala Debbarma (Folk Music and Dance - Tripura)
 2020 – Sang Jangmu (Folk Dance - Arunachal Pradesh)
 2020 – Gafoor Khan Manganiar (Folk Music - Rajasthan)
 2020 – Zachunu Keyho (Folk Music - Nagaland)
 2021 – Silbi Passah (Folk Music - Meghalaya)
 2021 – Durga Prasad Murmu (Folk Music and Dance - Jharkhand)
 2021 – Prashanna Gogoi (Folk Music & Dance - Assam)
 2021 – Gartigere Raghanna (H. N Raghavenda) (Folk Music - Karnataka)
 2021 – S Samundaram (Folk Music - Tamil Nadu)
 2021 – Data Ram Purohit (Folk Music & Theatre - Uttarakhand)
 2021 – Mahavir Singh Guddu (Folk Music & Dance - Haryana)
 2021 – N Tiken Singh (Folk Music - Manipur)
 2021 – N. Sekar (Folk Music - Puducherry)
 2021 – R. Murugan (Instrument Making - Tamil Nadu)

Puppetry/ Mime/ Allied arts of traditional forms

 1978 – Kathinanada Das (Ravanchhaya puppetry), Orissa
 1979 – U. Kogga Devanna Kamath (Gombeatta puppetry), Karnataka
 1980 – K.L. Krishnan Kutty Pulavar (Tholpava Koothu), Kerala
 1981 – M.R. Ranganatha Rao, Karnataka
 1983 – Meher Rustom Contractor, Gujarat
 1987 – Suresh Dutta, West Bengal
 1992 – Dadi Dorab Pudumjee, Delhi
 1995 – T. Hombiah, Karnataka
 1998 – Kolhacharan Sahu (Ravanchhaya puppetry), Orissa
 1999 – B.H. Puttashamachar, Karanataka
 2001 – Hiren Bhattacharya, Assam
 2003 – Puran Bhatt, Rajasthan
 2005 – Ganpat Sakharam Masge, Maharashtra
 2010 – K. Chinna Anjannamma (Shadow puppetry: Tolu Bommalata), Andhra Pradesh
 2010 – K.V. Ramakrishnan and K.C. Ramakrishnan (Glove puppetry: Pava Kathakali), Kerala
 2012 – Prafulla Karmakar (Traditional Puppetry - West Bengal)
 2013 – Lilavati M Kavi (Bajaj), Puppetry
 2014 – K. Kesavasamy (Puppetry - Puducherry)
 2016 – Prabhitangsu Das (Contemporary Puppetry - Tripura)
 2018 – Anupama Hoskere (Classical String Puppetry of Karnataka, Bengaluru)
 2020 – Meena Nayak (Puppetry - Maharashtra)

Films

Overall Contribution/Scholarship

References

External links

Awards established in 1952
Civil awards and decorations of India
Indian film awards
Indian music awards
Indian art awards
Dance awards
Sangeet Natak Akademi
1952 establishments in India

hi:संगीत नाटक अकादमी पुरस्कार